Kiki Bertens and Johanna Larsson were the defending champions, but Bertens chose not to participate this year. Larsson played alongside Kirsten Flipkens, but lost in the final to Nicole Melichar and Anna Smith, 6–3, 3–6, [9–11].

Seeds

Draw

Draw

References
 Main Draw

Nurnberger Versicherungscupandnbsp;- Doubles
2017 Doubles
Nurnberger Versicherungscupandnbsp;- Doubles